By-elections to nine state assembly constituencies were held in Tamil Nadu, in four separate phases. Election for Thirumangalam was held on 9 January and for Bargur, Thondamuthur, Ilayankudi, Cumbum, and Srivaikuntam constituencies on 18 August. Also, election took place for Vandavasi and Tiruchendur constituency on 19 December 2009 and finally for Pennagaram constituency on 27 March 2010.  Dravida Munnetra Kazhagam (DMK) defeated All India Anna Dravida Munnetra Kazhagam (AIADMK) in Thirumangalam in the first phase and kept the winning momentum in the following general election.

In the second phase, DMK-Indian National Congress alliance swept the elections. In the third phase, DMK took advantage by winning both vacant assembly seats. All three elections witnessed high turnout, 89% in Thirumangalam, average 65% in the four constituencies in the second phase and average 80% in the two constituency in the third phase. Finally, DMK continued their momentum by winning the vacant Pennagaram seat, increasing their number of seats to 100.  The results of the first election was declared on 12 January, the second on 21 August, the third on 23 December and the fourth on 30 March 2010. The election results were not expected to change the prospects of the party in power, the DMK, and its Chief Minister M. Karunanidhi.

On 6 December 2009, M. Karunanidhi hinted that he might retire from active politics in June 2010. This news came before the third by-election, when he gave a speech at the function arranged by Arundathiyar organization.

Results
These results reflect the end of the year seat count in the state legislature.
Source: Express Buzz

 The number on the left, in the table, represents the total number of MLAs after the by-election, and the number in parenthesis represents, the seats picked up or lost due to the by-election
 The numbers presented for 2007, represents, the alliance, when the PMK, VCK and the left allied with the DMK and were part of the Democratic Progressive Alliance (DPA).
 PMK walked out of the AIADMK alliance, before the third by-election took place.

Boycott 
In the first by-election, PMK and the left parties, did not support the DMK candidate, which led to the alienation and breakup of the DPA. Citing concerns of the governance of M. Karunanidhi, and the alienation of his allies, they decided not to support anyone or participate in this by-election.
In the second by-election, three political parties boycotted the elections including All India Anna Dravida Munnetra Kazhagam, Marumalarchi Dravida Munnetra Kazhagam and Pattali Makkal Katchi. AIADMK general secretary J. Jayalalitha cited unreliability of Electronic voting machines as the reason for the poll boycott. Tamil Nadu Congress party leader K. V. Thangabalu said that ADMK chose not to contest polls for fear of losing them.
In the third by-election, AIADMK decided not to boycott the by-election that was set to take place on 19 December 2009 for two constituencies.  On 28 November 2009 the PMK decided to boycott the third assembly by-elections.

First by-election

Thirumangalam 
Source: Express buzz

Second by-election

Bargur 
The election was necessitated after the previous winner M. Thambidurai was elected to the Lok Sabha in 2009 election. After the initial rejection of Desiya Murpokku Dravida Kazhagam (DMDK) candidate V. Chandran's candidacy, he was accepted to contest as an independent with Murasu as a symbol, which is the symbol of DMDK. Twenty four of thirty one nominations were rejected. Accepted nominations include K. R. K. Narasimhan (Dravida Munnetra Kazhagam), K. Asokan (Bharatiya Janata Party), S. Kannu (Communist Party of India), K. Padmarajan (Independent), Maheshwari Kannappan (Independent), S. Sakthivel (Rajini Fans Association) and A. Rajesh (Independent).

Thondamuthur 
There were four candidates from recognised parties in contest in Thondamuthur constituency - M. Chinnaraju (Bharatiya Janata Party, BJP), M. N. Kandaswamy (Indian National Congress, INC), K. Thangavelu (DMDK) and V. Perumal (CPM). E. R. Easwaran of Kongu Nadu Munnetra Kazhagam (KMK) also contested the election. The seat fell vacant when the sitting member M. Kannappan resigned after switching parties from MDMK to DMK.

Ilayankudi 
Nine contestants were in fray in Ilayankudi constituency. They included three from major political parties, Suba. Mathiarasan of DMK, Azhagu. Balakrishnan of DMDK and P. M. Rajendran of BJP.

Srivaikuntam 
11 candidates were in competition in Srivaikuntam constituency. Candidates from major political parties included M.B. Sudalaiyandi of Indian National Congress, G. Thanalakshmi of Communist Party of India, S. Santhana Kumar of Bharatiya Janata Party and M. Soundarapandi of Desiya Murpokku Dravida Kazhagam.

Cumbum 
15 candidates were contesting the election including four candidates representing political parties. The candidates included N. Ramakrishnan of Dravida Munnetra Kazhagam, M. Sasikumar of Bharatiya Janata Party, K. Rajappan of Communist Party of India (Marxist), R. Arun Kumar of Desiya Murpokku Dravidar Kazhagam and G. Ramaraj of Uzhaippali Makkal Katchi.

Third by-election 
AIADMK decided not to boycott the by-election that was set to take place on 19 December 2009 for two constituencies. This election will not affect the party in power, but gives a chance for both DMK and AIADMK to pick up a seat. Congress has confirmed it will campaign for DMK, while MDMK confirmed that it will campaign for the AIADMK. The left parties (CPI and CPM) have decided to extend their support for the AIADMK.  On 23 November, the Pattali Makkal Katchi (PMK), who are not in alliance with either DMK or AIADMK, will only contest if the current Chief Minister M. Karunanidhi, ensures the election is run in a fair manner. The DMDK announced their candidates for the two constituencies on 27 November 2009.  On 28 November 2009 the PMK decided to boycott the assembly by-elections.  PMK recently walked out of the AIADMK alliance, and was expected to support the DMK candidates, but cited the dominant role of money in recent elections as one of the reasons for this decision.

For the first time, the Election Commission of India, was going to install webcams in the polling booths of the two constituencies, to monitor to see if proper procedures are taking place during voting in the polling booths.

Vandavasi 
The election was necessitated after the previous winner S. P. Jayaraman, representing DMK, died earlier this month. AIADMK announced P. Munusamy as their candidate on 23 November 2009.  On 24 November 2009, DMK announced that Kamalakannan is their candidate for this constituency.

Tiruchendur 
The election was necessitated after the resignation previous winner Anitha R. Radhakrishnan, due to the fact that he switched from AIADMK to DMK.  Amman T. Narayanan was announced as the candidate for AIADMK on 23 November 2009. The incumbent Anitha R. Radhakrishnan was announced as the candidate for the DMK on 24 November 2009.

Fourth by-election
DMK's P. N. P. Inbasekaran won the by-election for the Pennagaram Constituency held on 27 March 2010. This election was caused by the death of the incumbent DMK MLA P. N. Periannan on 1 December 2009. Turn out was 84.95% with 1,70,755 votes polled totally. Inbasekaran (the son of the Periannan) won by a margin of 36,000 votes over PMK's Tamil Kumaran.

See also 
Elections in Tamil Nadu
Government of Tamil Nadu
Legislature of Tamil Nadu

References 

State Assembly elections in Tamil Nadu
2000s in Tamil Nadu
2010s in Tamil Nadu
2009 State Assembly elections in India
2010 State Assembly elections in India
By-elections in Tamil Nadu